Île Yeye is an island of the Peros Banhos atoll in the Chagos Archipelago of the British Indian Ocean Territory. It is the island of the Chagos that is closest to the Maldives.

The island is located within the Peros Banhos Atoll Strict Nature Reserve.

References

Chagos Archipelago